Aitor López Rekarte (born 18 August 1975) is a Spanish retired footballer. He played as a defender on the right side, and sporadically on the other flank.

His professional career was closely connected to Real Sociedad, where he spent 13 of 15 total seasons, appearing in 338 competitive games.

Club career
Born in Mondragón, Basque Country, López Rekarte played a decade with local club Real Sociedad, with nearly 350 overall appearances with the first team. After being promoted to the main squad for 1997–98 he immediately became the starter, his worst output consisting of 26 games in his second professional season.

López Rekarte featured mostly at left back in that campaign as Real finished third, as habitual starter Agustín Aranzábal suffered a long injury lay-off. Eventually, he also became team captain, only missing one La Liga match in 2002–03 for the runners-up.

In July 2007, López Rekarte switched to newly promoted UD Almería, but appeared scarcely throughout the season as the Andalusians overachieved, being subsequently released. On 18 March 2009, he joined second division side SD Eibar in a deal until the end of the campaign. After the latter's relegation, he chose to retire from football at nearly 34.

International career
López Rekarte earned one cap for Spain, in a friendly against Scotland on 3 September 2004 (1–1, in Valencia). Previously, he helped the nation's under-21s win the 1998 UEFA European Championship.

Personal life
López Rekarte was the younger brother of another professional footballer, Luis, who also played for Real Sociedad, also being a right back and an international. His niece, Maitane López, was also involved in the sport.

Honours
Spain U21
UEFA European Under-21 Championship: 1998

References

External links

1975 births
Living people
People from Mondragón
Spanish footballers
Footballers from the Basque Country (autonomous community)
Association football defenders
La Liga players
Segunda División players
Segunda División B players
Real Sociedad B footballers
Real Sociedad footballers
UD Almería players
SD Eibar footballers
Spain youth international footballers
Spain under-21 international footballers
Spain under-23 international footballers
Spain international footballers
Basque Country international footballers